Elizabeth Cameron is an American national security expert specializing in biosecurity, biodefense, and bioterrorism. She is a professor at the Pandemic Center of the Brown University School of Public Health. Previously, she served as Senior Director for Global Health Security and Biodefense on the White House National Security Council staff.

Career 
Cameron holds a BA in Biology from the University of Virginia and a Ph.D. in Biology from the Human Genetics and Molecular Biology Program at the Johns Hopkins University.

With the transition to the Biden administration in January 2021, Cameron was appointed as Senior Director for Global Health Security and Biodefense to the newly reinstated directorate of the White House National Security Council staff. She returned to this office, which she had helped to establish during the Obama administration. The directorate had been disbanded by the Trump administration in May 2018, a decision that Cameron criticized in the Washington Post as having "contributed to the federal government’s sluggish domestic response" to the COVID-19 pandemic. Her previous work in this role included contributing to the development of the Global Health Security Agenda, an international effort by 69 countries to address the threat of infectious diseases. Cameron was also responsible for writing the 2016 "pandemic playbook" for the Obama White House, including a list of priorities for pandemic preparedness and response, which was said to have been "ignored by the [Trump] administration".

In 2017, Cameron assumed the role of Vice President for Global Biological Policy and Programs at the Nuclear Threat Initiative, a foreign policy think tank based in Washington, D.C. In this capacity, she co-led the development of the Global Health Security Index, a health security preparedness ranking of 195 states.

Between 2010 and 2013, Cameron worked in the Department of Defense, where she first served as Office Director for Cooperative Threat Reduction and later as Senior Adviser for the Assistant Secretary of Defense for Nuclear, Chemical & Biological Defense Programs. In recognition of her achievements, she was awarded the Office of the Secretary of Defense Medal for Exceptional Civilian Service.

Cameron is a member of the Council on Foreign Relations.

Media coverage 
The appointment and work of Cameron have been featured in various media outlets, including the New York Times, the Washington Post, CNBC, Politico, Wired, and Devex.

Moreover, Cameron herself has authored opinion pieces for the Washington Post, The Daily Beast, and The Hill. She has also been interviewed about her work on the 80,000 Hours podcast.

Selected publications

References

External links 

 Website of the Nuclear Threat Initiative's Global Biological Policy and Programs
 Website of the Global Health Security Index
 Website of the Global Health Security Agenda
 Interview with Elizabeth Cameron on the 80,000 Hours Podcast

Living people
Year of birth missing (living people)
United States National Security Council staffers
Obama administration personnel
Trump administration personnel
Biden administration personnel
Johns Hopkins University alumni
University of Virginia alumni
Brown University faculty